Jeonju National University of Education is a national university located in Jeonju, South Korea.

Alumni
Park Beom-shin, author.

See also
List of national universities in South Korea
List of universities and colleges in South Korea
Education in Korea

References

External links 
  

Buildings and structures in Jeonju
National universities of education in South Korea
Universities and colleges in North Jeolla Province
Educational institutions established in 1923
1923 establishments in Korea